Delmo Arcângelo Coelho Monteiro commonly known as Delmo (born 28 March 1973) is a Brazilian former footballer who played as a striker and scored more than 200 official goals for Amazonas state side São Raimundo.

Career
Born in Parintins, Delmo began playing football with local side São Raimundo in the Campeonato Amazonense. He spent most of his career with the club, winning the Copa Norte and Campeonato Amazonense three times each. He also helped São Raimundo qualify for the Campeonato Brasileiro Série B in 1999. Delmo scored goals for São Raimundo in Série B during 2002, 2003, 2004, 2005 and 2006. Delmo holds the record for most goals scored in the Campeonato Amazonense with 24 during the 2004 season.

Delmo also played club football with Amazonas sides Nacional Futebol Clube, Atlético Rio Negro Clube, Nacional Fast Clube and Manaus Compensão Esporte Clube.

After he retired from playing, Delmo became a coach. He was the assistant manager to Sérgio Duarte at São Raimundo and became interim manager following his dismissal in February 2012.

Honours 
 Nacional
Campeonato Amazonense: 1996

 São Raimundo
Copa Norte: 1999, 2000, 2001
Campeonato Amazonense: 2004, 2006

References

Sportspeople from Amazonas (Brazilian state)
1973 births
Living people
Brazilian footballers
Brazilian football managers
Campeonato Brasileiro Série B players
Campeonato Brasileiro Série C players
São Raimundo Esporte Clube footballers
Nacional Futebol Clube players
Atlético Rio Negro Clube players
Nacional Fast Clube players
São Raimundo Esporte Clube managers
Association football forwards